SV Werder Bremen is a German football club based in Bremen. This list contains all the footballers that have made over 100 league appearances for the club since the formation of the Bundesliga in 1963.

Players are listed according to the date of their first team debut. Appearances and goals are for Bundesliga and 2. Bundesliga (1980–81 and 2021–22) matches only.

Players

References
 Werder Bremen at worldfootball.net
 Werder Bremen at fussballdaten.de 

Players
 
Werder Bremen
Association football player non-biographical articles